John Cornelius Utz (June 21, 1844 – July 24, 1919) was an American politician who served in the Virginia House of Delegates.

References

External links 

1844 births
1919 deaths
Democratic Party members of the Virginia House of Delegates
19th-century American politicians
20th-century American politicians